The 1994 World Snooker Championship (also referred to as the 1994 Embassy World Snooker Championship) was a professional ranking snooker tournament that took place between 16 April and 2 May 1994 at the Crucible Theatre in Sheffield, England.

Stephen Hendry won his fourth world title by defeating Jimmy White 18–17 in the final.  The tournament was sponsored by cigarette manufacturer Embassy.

Overview
 Two-time world champion Alex Higgins qualified for the championship for the last time, losing 6–10 in the first round to Ken Doherty. 
 Cliff Thorburn, another former champion making his final World Championship appearance, lost 9–10 in the first round to Nigel Bond after leading 9–2.
 An 18-year-old Ronnie O'Sullivan knocked out 1985 champion Dennis Taylor, who was also making his final appearance at the World Championship. O'Sullivan won their first-round match 10–6, his first victory at the Crucible after losing in the first round on his debut the previous year.
 Stephen Hendry won his third consecutive world title and his fourth in five years. This achievement was all the more remarkable because he played every match after the first round with a broken elbow.
 This was Jimmy White's fifth consecutive final appearance, his fourth against Hendry, and his sixth overall. This was White's last appearance in a World Championship final and the closest he ever came to winning the tournament.
 Earlier in the tournament, Hendry had sealed his position as world number one with a 16–9 semi-final victory over Steve Davis. This was Davis' eleventh and last appearance in a World Championship semi-final.

Prize fund
The breakdown of prize money for this year is shown below: 

Winner: £180,000
Runner-up: £110,000
Semi-final: £55,000
Quarter-final: £27,500
Last 16: £15,000
Last 32: £8,500
Last 48: £6,000
Last 64: £4,000

Last 96: £1,750
Last 128: £1,000
Last 192: £600
Stage one highest break: £5,000
Stage two highest break: £15,400
Stage two maximum break: £100,000
Total: £1,068,000

Main draw 
Shown below are the results for each round. The numbers in parentheses beside some of the players are their seeding ranks (each championship has 16 seeds and 16 qualifiers).

Century breaks
There were 35 century breaks in the Championship, a joint record with the 1993 tournament. The highest break of the tournament was 143 made by Alan McManus. The highest break of the qualifying stage was 143 made by Karl Payne.

 143, 105, 102  Alan McManus
 139, 102  Martin Clark
 139  Cliff Thorburn
 137  Billy Snaddon
 134, 108  Brian Morgan
 134, 101  Steve Davis
 133, 112  Drew Henry
 132  John Parrott
 124, 120, 120, 109, 100  Stephen Hendry

 124  Peter Ebdon
 119, 100  Ken Doherty
 118, 100  Fergal O'Brien
 118  Willie Thorne
 116, 112, 108, 107, 103  Jimmy White
 115, 107, 100  Darren Morgan
 114  Dene O'Kane
 100  James Wattana

References

1994
World Championship
World Snooker Championship
Sports competitions in Sheffield
April 1994 sports events in the United Kingdom
May 1994 sports events in the United Kingdom